Imcheon Seowon may refer to

Imcheon Seowon, Andong in Gyeongsangbuk-do, South Korea
Imcheon Seowon, Jinju in Gyeongsangnam-do, South Korea